Kohala High School is a public, co-educational high school of the Hawaii State Department of Education. It serves grades nine through twelve and was established in 1926.

General information
Kohala High School is located in Kapaau in Hawaii County on the Island of Hawaii.  The campus is at 54-3611 Akoni Pule Highway, adjacent to Kohala Elementary School. The mascot is the Cowboys and its school colors are black and gold.

History
Kohala School was started in 1926 for students from the North Kohala Coastal Sugar Cane Communities. The high school was established a few years later at its current location.

The school, originally known as Kohala High & Elementary, was located at its original location, now the location of Kohala Middle School in Halaula. In the 1930s, the High School was relocated to its current location due to enrollment growth, but remained Kohala High & Elementary School. In the late 1950s, a new elementary school campus was built adjacent to the high school. A few years later, most of the old high school buildings were demolished and rebuilt, appearing almost identical to the elementary campus buildings. The only buildings that were not demolished were the gymnasium and a classroom building adjacent to the gymnasium. In 1971, a new cafeteria was constructed servicing both the high school and the elementary school. In the early 2000s, the school was broken up into Kohala High School, Kohala Middle School and Kohala Elementary School. Kohala High School's rival is Honokaa High & Intermediate School.

Alma Mater
From afar Kohala mountain,

Green against the sky.

Gaze upon our alma mater,

of Kohala High.

Hail Kohala High School,

thru the cane fields ring.

Hail to thee dear black and gold,

Hail, all hail we sing.

Though the years come and go,

and our faces change.

Still our hearts will hold thy memories,

of Kohala High.

Hail Kohala High School,

thru the cane fields ring.

Hail to thee dear black and gold,

Hail, all hail we sing.

References

External links
 Kohala High School Official Website
 Kohala School Info by Hawaii DOE

Educational institutions established in 1926
Public high schools in Hawaii County, Hawaii
1926 establishments in Hawaii